A kamui is a spiritual or divine being in Ainu mythology, a term denoting a supernatural entity composed of or possessing spiritual energy.

Kamui may also refer to:

People and groups
 Kamui Fujiwara (born 1959), Japanese game designer and cartoonist
 Kamui Kobayashi (born 1986), Japanese racing driver
 Gackt (born 1973), Japanese musician who has possible legal surname Camui

Fiction
 Kamui (1964 manga), a manga series by Sanpei Shirato
 Kamui (2001 manga), a manga series by Shingo Nanami
 Kamui the Ninja, a 1969 anime television series based on the Shirato manga
 Kamui Gaiden, a 2009 live-action film adaptation of the Shirato manga
 The Dagger of Kamui, a Japanese novel series
 Kamui, a character in the manga Gintama
 Kamui Shiro, a character in the manga X
 Kamui, default name for the Avatar in the Japanese version of Fire Emblem Fates (Fire Emblem If)
 Kamui, a character in Fire Emblem Gaiden and its remake, Fire Emblem Echoes: Shadows of Valentia
 Kamui (神衣), an outfit giving the wearer godlike abilities, in the anime Kill la Kill
 Kamui (神威), a powerful teleportation technique in the manga Naruto
 Kamui, the name of a body armor of the twelve Olympians in the manga Saint Seiya
 Kanna Kamui, a character in the manga Miss Kobayashi's Dragon Maid
 Kamui, a summoned monster in the video game Monster Rancher 2
 Kamui Tokinomiya (朱鷺宮 神依), a character in the video game series Arcana Heart
 Kamui Woods, a character in the manga My Hero Academia
 Kirito Kamui (鹿矛囲 桐斗), a villain in the second season of Psycho-Pass
 Kamui Uehara, a central antagonist in the video game The Silver Case
 Kamui, the name of Teddie's reborn persona once his social link reaches rank 10 in the video game Persona 4
 Kamui, the northern and final major area in the video game Ōkami

Other uses
 Mount Kamui (disambiguation)
 Kamui Tips, a Japanese manufacturer of billiard and pool cue tips
 Kamui (train), a train service in Hokkaido, Japan

Japanese unisex given names